Hpasaung Township is a township of Bawlakhe District in the Kayah State of Myanmar.
The capital town is Hpasaung.

References

Townships of Kayah State